The NWA Pacific International Heavyweight Championship was the primary singles championship of 50th State Big Time Wrestling, the NWA territory based in Hawaii. The title was originally the Hawaiian version of the NWA United States Heavyweight Championship that was defended in Hawaii. It existed from 1962 until 1968. It was renamed the NWA North American Heavyweight Championship (Hawaii version) in 1968 and renamed again as the NWA Pacific International Heavyweight Championship in 1978, which was the name it used until it was retired in 1980.

Title history

See also

National Wrestling Alliance

References

50th State Big Time Wrestling championships
Heavyweight wrestling championships
NWA United States Heavyweight Championships
North American professional wrestling championships
International professional wrestling championships
Professional wrestling in Hawaii